Anupriya Kapoor is an Indian television actress. She is known for playing Taani Banerjee in Star Plus's Tere Liye and Vibha in MTV India's Warrior High.

Personal life
Anupriya Kapoor moved to Mumbai with brother Vyom Kapoor when she participated in Voice of India. Her parents are separated and she lives with her mother, younger brother and her grandma. She has completed her graduation in Political Science through a correspondence course from Delhi University.

Career
Kapoor started her career with Star One's Miley Jab Hum Tum. Later she appeared in Yash Raj TV's Seven, in Ssshhhh...Phir Koi Hai and in Rishta.com.

From 2010 to 2011, Kapoor portrayed Taani Banerjee in Star Plus's Tere Liye opposite Harshad Chopda.

In 2013 she shot an episode for Bindass's Yeh Hai Aashiqui opposite Shakti Arora. In 2015, she played Vibha in MTV India's Warrior High.

In 2016, she was honoured with Delhi Gaurav Award.

Filmography

Television

Awards

References

External links

Living people
Indian soap opera actresses
Actresses in Hindi television
21st-century Indian actresses
1990 births